Al Unser (1939–2021) was an American racecar driver.

Al Unser may also refer to:
Al Unser Jr. (born 1962), his son, also an American racecar driver
Al Richard Unser (born 1982), his grandson, also an American racecar driver
Al Unser (baseball) (1912–1995), American baseball player

See also
 Unser (disambiguation)
 Al (disambiguation)